Clément Venturini (born 16 October 1993 in Villeurbanne) is a French cyclist, who currently rides for UCI WorldTeam . In 2011, he won the UCI Junior World Cyclo-cross Championship. In May 2018, he was named in the startlist for the 2018 Giro d'Italia. In August 2019, he was named in the startlist for the 2019 Vuelta a España. In August 2020, he was named in the start list for the 2020 Tour de France.

Major results

Cyclo-cross

2010–2011
 1st  UCI World Junior Championships
 UCI Junior World Cup
1st Pontchâteau
2011–2012
 Under-23 Challenge de la France
2nd Lignières-en-Berry
2nd Rodez
 3rd National Under-23 Championships
2012–2013
 Under-23 Challenge National
1st Pontchâteau
1st Saverne
 2nd National Under-23 Championships
2013–2014
 1st  National Under-23 Championships
 1st Rennaz
 Under-23 Challenge National
1st Saint-Etienne-lès-Remiremont
1st Quelneuc
1st Flamanville
2014–2015
 1st Overall EKZ CrossTour
1st Hittnau
2nd Dielsdorf
 1st Marle
 1st Sion-Valais
 2nd Overall Coupe de France
1st Sisteron
3rd Besançon
3rd Lanarvily
 2nd National Championships
 Under-23 Superprestige
3rd Diegem
2015–2016
 1st Overall Coupe de France
1st Albi
1st Quelneuc
1st Flamanville
 EKZ CrossTour
1st Dielsdorf
 1st La Mézière
 1st Marle
 1st Pierric
 1st Steinmaur
 2nd National Championships
2016–2017
 1st  National Championships
 1st Overall Coupe de France
1st Bagnoles de l'Orne
1st Nommay
2nd Erôme Gervans
 EKZ CrossTour
1st Aigle
 1st La Mézière
 Soudal Classics
2nd Hasselt
2017–2018
 Coupe de France
1st Flamanville
 1st Sion-Valais
 1st Nyon
 Soudal Classics
2nd Leuven
2018–2019
 1st  National Championships
 2nd La Meziere
2019–2020
 1st  National Championships
 1st Troyes
 1st Coulounieix-Chamiers
2020–2021
 1st  National Championships
 2nd Troyes
2022–2023
 1st  National Championships
 1st Boulzicourt
 Copa de España
2nd Xativa
2nd Valencia

Road

2014
 Rhône-Alpes Isère Tour
1st  Points classification
1st Stage 4
2015
 2nd La Roue Tourangelle
2016
 1st Stage 2 Tour of Austria
 1st  Points classification, Rhône-Alpes Isère Tour
 2nd Route Adélie
 3rd Boucles de l'Aulne
 6th La Roue Tourangelle
 6th Grand Prix de Denain
 8th Grand Prix d'Isbergues
2017
 1st  Overall Four Days of Dunkirk
1st  Points classification
1st  Young rider classification
 1st Stage 6 Tour of Austria
 3rd Overall Boucles de la Mayenne
 10th Route Adélie
2018
 1st Stage 2 Route d'Occitanie
 5th La Roue Tourangelle
2019
 3rd Route Adélie
 7th Grand Prix La Marseillaise
2020
 4th Road race, National Championships
 4th Le Samyn
 5th Overall Tour de Wallonie
 6th Grand Prix La Marseillaise
 7th Clásica de Almería
2022
 5th Polynormande
 6th Tour du Doubs
 7th Grand Prix du Morbihan
 7th La Roue Tourangelle
 8th Classic Loire Atlantique

Grand Tour general classification results timeline

References

External links

1993 births
Living people
French male cyclists
People from Villeurbanne
Cyclo-cross cyclists
Sportspeople from Lyon Metropolis
Cyclists from Auvergne-Rhône-Alpes